WordTech Communications LLC is one of the largest poetry publishers in the United States, producing nearly 50 titles per year. The press is owned and operated by Lori Jareo and Kevin Walzer. Some of their more notable authors are Ravi Shankar (poet),  Philip Dacey, Rachel Hadas, J. E. Pitts, Jacqueline Kolosov, Rhina Espaillat, Annie Finch, Pamela Harrison, Penelope Schott, Nick Carbo, Allison Joseph, James Reiss, and Carol Jennings.

Wordtech, based in Cincinnati, Ohio, uses several imprints to disseminate its works: WordTech Editions, Cherry Grove Collections, Word Press, Turning Point, CustomWords and David Robert Books. Wordtech uses print-on-demand technology to print and distribute its titles, which gives the press more flexibility in regard to storage and distribution of its books.

Walzer and Jareo founded WordTech Communications in 1998 as an editorial services company, specializing in copy editing and copy writing, but in 2000, began publishing poetry. They began using the book contest model, wherein contests fees defray costs of publication and prize monies. When their sales revenues outgrew their contest fee revenues, they discontinued their prize and fee system and relied on sales revenues to fund costs, beginning in 2004, a policy which is still current.

References

External links
 Parent company website
 WordTech Editions
 Word Press
 Turning Point
 Custom Words
 Cherry Grove Collections
 Review of House of the Cardamom Seed by Penelope Scambly Schott: Empty Mirror > January 4, 2019
 Review of What to Make of It by Pamela Harrison: Rattle > June 15, 2013

Publishing companies of the United States
Publishing companies established in 1998
Book publishing companies based in Ohio
Companies based in Cincinnati
Poetry publishers
1998 establishments in Ohio